Take A Girl Like You is a song by The Foundations. It was used as the title theme song for the 1970 Jonathan Miller directed film Take a Girl Like You that starred Hayley Mills and Oliver Reed. The B side of the single "Im Gonna Be A Rich Man" was written by Foundations lead singer Colin Young.

Releases
 "Take A Girl Like You" / "I'm Gonna Be A Rich Man" - PYE 7N 17904 
 "Take A Girl Like You" / "I'm Gonna Be A Rich Man" - UNI 55210

References

Link
 https://www.imdb.com/title/tt0066436/soundtrack

1970 singles
Pye Records singles
The Foundations songs
Songs written by Bill Martin (songwriter)
Songs written by Phil Coulter
1970 songs